Bu (hangul: 부; hanja: 缶) is a clay pot beaten with a bamboo whisk and used in Korean Confucian court and ritual music; derived from the Chinese fǒu.

Asian percussion instruments
Korean musical instruments